The James Madison Dukes men's basketball statistical leaders are individual statistical leaders of the James Madison Dukes men's basketball program in various categories, including points, rebounds, assists, steals, and blocks. Within those areas, the lists identify single-game, single-season, and career leaders. The Dukes represent James Madison University in the NCAA Division I Sun Belt Conference.

James Madison began competing in intercollegiate men's basketball in 1969, when the school was known as Madison College; the current university name was adopted in 1976. The NCAA did not officially record assists as a stat until the 1983–84 season, and blocks and steals until the 1985–86 season, but Jacksonville's record books includes players in these stats before these seasons. These lists are updated through the end of the 2021–22 season.

Scoring

Rebounds

Assists

Steals

Blocks

References

Lists of college basketball statistical leaders by team
Statistical